Ywen Lau (born 24 January 2000) is a Singaporean sabre fencer.

Education 
Lau studied at United World College of South East Asia. In 2017, Lau was accepted to study at Stanford University in California, United States in September 2018.

Biography
Lau represented Singapore at the 2014 Asian Games as the youngest participant ever in the fencing competition. In 2014 she became the first female fencer representing Singapore to reach the quarter finals of the 2014 Asian Fencing Championship. Lau is currently ranked number 1 on the senior level in Singapore for Women's Sabre, she also finished in the 25th spot at the 2015 Cadet & Junior World Fencing Championships. 

Lau won a gold medal at the 2016 Cadet & Junior World Fencing Championships held in Bourges, France, as well as a silver medal at the 2016 Asian Fencing Cadet Championships. 

In 2017, Lau won the gold medal in the 2017 Southeast Asian Games in Kuala Lumpur, Malaysia. 

Her elder sister is reportedly her inspiration for taking up fencing.

She represents Asgard Fencing in Singapore.

Awards

2017 SEA Games, Women's Sabre Individual - Gold
2016 Cadet & Junior World Fencing Championships, Women's Sabre - Gold
2016 Asian Fencing Cadet Championships, Women's Sabre - Gold
2015 SEA Games, Women's Sabre Team - Bronze
2015 SEA Games, Women's Sabre Individual - Bronze
2014 Korea Asian Fencing Championships – Quarter-finalist
2014 Singapore Fencing Singapore International – Gold
2014 Southeast Asia Fencing Cadet (U-17) Championships – Gold
2014 Singapore Cadet (U-17) World Cup – Gold
2014 Southeast Asia Fencing Championships (Senior) – 5th

References

Living people
2000 births
Singaporean sportspeople of Chinese descent
Fencers at the 2014 Asian Games
Fencers at the 2018 Asian Games
Asian Games competitors for Singapore
Singaporean female sabre fencers